Metacarpal arteries can refer to:
 Palmar metacarpal arteries (arteriae metacarpales palmares, arteriae metacarpeae volares)
 Dorsal metacarpal arteries (arteriae metacarpales dorsales)